The governor of Tarlac, is the chief executive of the provincial government of Tarlac.

List of governors of Tarlac (1988-present)

References

Governors of Tarlac
Tarlac